This is a list of defunct airlines of the Maldives.

See also
 List of airlines of the Maldives
 List of airports in the Maldives

References

Maldives
Airlines
Airlines, defunct